is the fifth studio album by J-pop singer Kotoko. It was released on October 5, 2011 under Warner Music Japan.

Track listing 

Kotoko (singer) albums
2011 albums